The 2004 Speedway World Cup (SWC) was the 4th FIM Speedway World Cup season. The Final took place on 7 August 2004 in Poole, Great Britain. The tournament was won by Sweden (49 pts) and they beat host team Great Britain (48 pts), Denmark (32 pts) and Poland (22 pts) in the Final.

Qualification

Venues
Two cities were selected to host SWC finals events:

Tournament

Final classification

See also
 2004 Speedway Grand Prix

References

 
2004
World T